Samuel Cunliffe Lister, 1st Baron Masham (1 January 1815 – 2 February 1906), was an English inventor and industrialist, notable for inventing the Lister nip comb.

Early life
He was born in Calverley Hall (now Calverley House Farm- not to be confused with the medieval manor of the same name), near Bradford, the son of Ellis Cunliffe Lister (1774–1853), the first Member of Parliament elected for Bradford after the Reform Act of 1832 and Mary (née Kay) Lister. In 1854 he married Anne Dearden, daughter of John Dearden; they had five daughters. He started his working life working for a Liverpool firm of merchants.

Industry and enterprise

Lister went on to play a key role in the development of Bradford's wool industry during the nineteenth century Industrial Revolution. The textile industry transformed Bradford from a small rural town into a rich and famous city. As well as being a successful mill owner he occasionally diverged to other subjects, such as an air brake for railways. He was fond of outdoor sports, especially coursing and shooting, and was a keen patron of the fine arts.

In 1838 he and his elder brother John started as worsted spinners and manufacturers in a new mill which their father built for them at Manningham. Lister's Mill (otherwise known as Manningham Mills), and its owner, were particularly well known in the district. The business eventually made Lister one of Bradford's most famous fathers, a multi-millionaire and the provider of thousands of jobs in the city. Lister's Mill changed the identity of the region, and its economy. Lister himself came to epitomise Victorian enterprise. However it has been suggested that his capitalist attitude made trade unions necessary.

Textiles 

Lister invented the Lister nip comb which separated and straightened raw wool, which has to be done before it can be spun into worsted yarn, and in the nineteenth century it was a hot, dirty and tiring job. By inventing the nip comb, Lister revolutionised the industry.

Around 1855 he began work to find a way of utilising the fibre contained in silk waste. The task occupied his time for many years and brought him to the verge of bankruptcy, but at last he succeeded in perfecting silk-combing appliances which enabled him to make good quality yarn at a low cost. Another important invention in connection with silk manufacture was a velvet loom patent that he bought in 1867 to the Catalan inventor Jacint Barrau. The new loom was built at Manningham Mills by Jaume Reixach, Barrau's foreman and Lister's Mill director afterwards, and made him very rich. However, the business was seriously affected by the prohibitory duties imposed by the United States, making him an early critic of the British policy of free trade.

Honours 

In 1887 he was appointed High Sheriff of Yorkshire.

In 1891 he was made a peer; he took his title from the little Yorkshire town of Masham, close to which is Swinton Park, purchased by him in 1888. In 1898, Lister was awarded the freedom of the City of Bradford.

He died at Swinton Park on 2 February 1906, and was succeeded by his son, Samuel Cunliffe Lister, 2nd Baron Masham.

Lister Park 

A statue of him now stands in Lister Park, in Manningham, Bradford, West Yorkshire, sculpted by Matthew Noble from a block of white Sicilian marble and unveiled on Saturday 15 May 1875 by W. E. Forster, then Member of Parliament for Bradford. Lister Park was donated to the people of Bradford by Lister.

Arms

See also
Samuel Lister Academy

References

External links 

 Archival material at Leeds University Library

1815 births
1906 deaths
Businesspeople from Bradford
English inventors
Barons in the Peerage of the United Kingdom
High Sheriffs of Yorkshire
Peers of the United Kingdom created by Queen Victoria
19th-century English businesspeople